Sir Joseph Jekyll  (166319 August 1738), of Westminster, was a British barrister, judge and Whig politician who sat in the English and British House of Commons for 40 years  from 1697 to 1738. He became Master of the Rolls in 1717.

Early life and career as a barrister
Jekyll was born in 1663 to John Jekyll of the Fishmonger's Company and alderman, of St Stephen Walbrook, London, and his second wife Tryphena. He was the half-brother of Thomas Jekyll. He attended a non-conformist seminary in Islington before being admitted to the Middle Temple in 1680. He was called to the Bar in 1687. Thanks to his connections with Middle Temple he became an associate of the Lord Chancellor, Lord Somers, and later married Somers' sister, Elizabeth. With Somers' support he became Chief Justice of Cheshire in June 1697, succeeding John Coombe, and was knighted on 12 December of that year. In 1699 he became a Reader of Middle Temple. In 1700 he became a Serjeant-at-Law, in 1702 a King's Serjeant and finally Prime Serjeant in 1714. Jekyll was very active in bringing cases before the House of Lords, acting in 14 cases in 1706 alone.

Political career
Jekyll was returned as a Whig Member of Parliament for Eye at a by-election on 14 December 1697 and was returned again in the following year at the 1698 English general election.  He was seen as part of the Whig Junto . He was  extremely active in parliament  and   an excellent speaker. He played a role in drafting various bills and acts.  Occasionally he voted against the party, mainly because he supported greater reform of the electoral system and the removal of bribery and corruption. He was returned unopposed for Eye in the two general elections of 1701 and in 1702 and 1705. Returned again at the 1708 British general election he was involved in the impeachment of Henry Sacheverell in 1709 and 1710. He was returned again for Eye at the 1710 British general election but at the 1713 British general election was returned instead for Lymington. 

At the 1715 British general election Jekyll was returned again for Lymington. He was  asked to participate in the secret committee tasked with preparing the impeachment of the Earl of Oxford and the Duke of Ormonde, which he refused to support. He  persuaded the government to open an investigation into the collapse of the South Sea Company in 1720. At the 1722 British general election 
he was returned as MP for Reigate where he was returned again in 1727 and 1734. He sponsored the Mortmain Act and the Gin Act 1736, and was noted for his opposition to intoxication, which annoyed the public so much that he was forced to have a guard at his house at all times. Under Robert Walpole he remained independent of the government in terms of how he voted, and was described by Alexander Pope as "an odd old Whig, who never change his principles or wig".  

Outside  Parliament, Jekyll provided £600 to fund the colony at Jekyll Island, and as a result James Oglethorpe named the island in the Province of Georgia after him.

Master of the Rolls
On 13 July 1717, Jekyll was appointed Master of the Rolls, and the same year became a Privy Councillor. His time as Master "was distinguished by legal ability, integrity and despatch", and during this period he helped write The Judicial Authority of the Master of the Rolls. He was given the Great Seal on 7 January 1725, and held it until 1 June.

Death and legacy
On 19 August 1738 he died of "a mortification in the bowels", and was buried in the Rolls Chapel. He had no children. In his will he left £20,000 to help pay off the national debt, something Lord Mansfield described as "a very foolish bequest.. he might as well have attempted to stop the middle arch of Blackfriars Bridge with his full-bottomed wig".

Jekyll Island is named in his honor.

References

Bibliography

1663 births
1738 deaths
Knights Bachelor
Members of the Middle Temple
Members of the Privy Council of Great Britain
Serjeants-at-law (England)
Masters of the Rolls
English MPs 1695–1698
English MPs 1698–1700
English MPs 1701
English MPs 1702–1705
English MPs 1705–1707
Members of the Parliament of Great Britain for English constituencies
Whig (British political party) MPs for English constituencies
British MPs 1707–1708
British MPs 1708–1710
British MPs 1710–1713
British MPs 1713–1715
British MPs 1715–1722
British MPs 1722–1727
British MPs 1727–1734
British MPs 1734–1741